Barkat Ullah Bulu (born 20  December 1956) is a Bangladesh Nationalist Party politician and a former Jatiya Sangsad member representing the Noakhali-2 and Noakhali-3 constituencies in the 5th, 6th, 7th and 9th parliament. He served as the state minister of commerce during 2001–2003.

Career
Bulu was elected to parliament from Noakhali-3 as a Bangladesh Nationalist Party (BNP) candidate in 2008. He is the Joint Secretary General and Vice-Chairman of BNP.

References

Living people
1956 births
Bangladesh Nationalist Party politicians
5th Jatiya Sangsad members
6th Jatiya Sangsad members
7th Jatiya Sangsad members
9th Jatiya Sangsad members
Place of birth missing (living people)
People from Begumganj Upazila